Henri Lambert (1862–1934) was a Belgian engineer and glass works owner at Charleroi near Brussels. His glass works was the largest in the world in that time. He was one of the first occupied with social economy. He spoke Walloon with his blue collar workers, which was exceptional in that time. He was a prolific writer (in French) of articles for newspaper and political journals, brochures, and books on political philosophy, and had several of his works translated into German and English. He favoured individualism, free trade, and international peace. He also wrote works about corporations, trade unions, government, democracy, and representation, voicing bold and well-intentioned ideas (which may not be altogether consistent). But his criticism of the principle of limited liability in connection with corporations is an original point which seems to have attracted attention at the turn of the century, as well as his ideas about the organisation of trade unions. He was called upon to address lawyers' and economists' associations and other bodies.

Publications
1893
 (Copy of a letter to L'Indépendance Belge, 27 December 1892.)
1894

1895

1897

1913

1914

1915

 A letter published in The Manchester Guardian, The Westminster Gazette, New York Evening Post, New York Evening Mail & L'Indépendance Belge (London edition).
1916

 An English translation of the work published the same year in the Journal des économistes, with an introduction by the Rt. Hon. Lord Courtney of Penwith.
1917

 A letter published in the Philadelphia Public Ledger, Springfield Daily Republican, New York Evening Mail and Johnstown Daily Democrat.
1918
 A letter published in the Philadelphia Public Ledger, Springfield Daily Republican, New York Evening Mail and Johnstown Daily Democrat. 

1919

1920

1922

 Authorized translation from the French by G. Flachsbart.
1924

1931

1933

1935

Articles

1893

1895

1896

 

1899

1906

1907

1908

1909

1910

1911
 

1912

1913

1914

1915

1916

1917

 As published in the Philadelphia Public Ledger, Springfield Republican, Johnstown Democrat and Ploughshare (London), Journal of the Socialist Quaker Society.
1918

 A letter published in the Philadelphia Public Ledger, Springfield Daily Republican, New York Evening Mail and Johnstown Daily Democrat.
 Also published as 

 A translation of the article was published in the North American Review in April 1918.
 A letter published in the Philadelphia Public Ledger, Springfield Daily Republican, New York Evening Mail and Johnstown Daily Democrat. 

 Also published as 

1919
 

 Also published as "Disarmament and freedom of the seas" in The World Tomorrow, February 1919.

1920

1921

1922

 (Offprint, text slightly different from the previous one.)

1924

1925

1926

1927

1930

1931

1932

1933

1934

References

 

1862 births
1934 deaths
19th-century Belgian engineers
Belgian writers in French
People from Charleroi
Political philosophers
20th-century Belgian philosophers